Murad III (4 July 1546 – 16 January 1595) was Sultan of the Ottoman Empire from 1574 until his death in 1595. His rule saw battles with the Habsburgs and exhausting wars with the Safavids. The long-independent Morocco was at a time made a vassal of the empire but they would regain independence in 1582. His reign also saw the empire's expanding influence on the eastern coast of Africa. However, the empire would be beset by increasing corruption and inflation from the New World which led to unrest among the Janissary and commoners. Relations with Elizabethan England were cemented during his reign as both had a common enemy in the Spanish. He was a great patron in the arts where he commissioned the Siyer-i-Nebi and other illustrated manuscripts.

Early life
Born in Manisa on 4 July 1546, Şehzade Murad was the oldest son of Şehzade Selim and his powerful wife Nurbanu Sultan. He received a good education and learned Arabic and Persian language. After his ceremonial circumcision in 1557, Murad's grandfather, the Sultan Suleiman I, appointed him sancakbeyi (governor) of Akşehir in 1558. At the age of 18 he was appointed sancakbeyi of Saruhan. Suleiman died (1566) when Murad was 20, and his father became the new sultan, Selim II. Selim II broke with tradition by sending only his oldest son out of the palace to govern a province, assigning Murad to Manisa.

Reign
Selim died in 1574 and was succeeded by Murad, who began his reign by having his five younger brothers strangled. His authority was undermined by harem influences – more specifically, those of his mother and later of his favorite concubine Safiye Sultan, often to the detriment of Sokollu Mehmed Pasha's influence on the court. Under Selim II power had only been maintained by the effective leadership of the powerful Grand Vizier Sokollu Mehmed Pasha, who remained in office until his assassination in October 1579. During Murad's reign the northern borders with the Habsburg monarchy were defended by the Bosnian governor Hasan Predojević. The reign of Murad III was marked by exhausting wars on the empire's western and eastern fronts. The Ottomans also suffered defeats in battles such as the Battle of Sisak.

Expedition to Morocco
 

Abd al-Malik became a trusted member of the Ottoman establishment during his exile. He made the proposition of making Morocco an Ottoman vassal in exchange for the support of Murad III in helping him gain the Saadi throne.

With an army of 10,000 men whom were mostly Turks, Ramazan Pasha and Abd al-Malik left from Algiers to install Abd al-Malik as an Ottoman vassal ruler of Morocco. Ramazan Pasha conquered Fez which caused the Saadi Sultan to flee to Marrakesh which was also conquered, Abd al-Malik then assumed rule over Morocco as a client of the Ottomans.

Abd al-Malik made a deal with the Ottoman troops by paying them a large amount of gold and sending them back to Algiers, suggesting a looser concept of vassalage than Murad III may have thought. Murad's name was recited in the Friday prayer and stamped on coinage marking the two traditional signs of sovereignty in the Islamic world. The reign of Abd al-Malik is understood to be a period of Moroccan vassalage to the Ottoman Empire. Abd al-Malik died in 1578 and was succeeded by his brother Ahmad al-Mansur who formally recognised the suzerainty of the Ottoman Sultan at the start of his reign while remaining de facto independent, however he stopped minting coins in Murads name, dropped his name from the Khutba and declared his full independence in 1582.

War with the Safavids

The Ottomans had been at peace with the neighbouring rivaling Safavid Empire since 1555, per the Treaty of Amasya, that for some time had settled border disputes. But in 1577 Murad declared war, starting the Ottoman–Safavid War (1578–1590), seeking to take advantage of the chaos in the Safavid court after the death of Shah Tahmasp I. Murad was influenced by viziers Lala Kara Mustafa Pasha and Sinan Pasha and disregarded the opposing counsel of Grand Vizier Sokollu. Murad also fought the Safavids which would drag on for 12 years, ending with the Treaty of Constantinople (1590), which resulted in temporary significant territorial gains for the Ottomans.

Ottoman activity in the Horn of Africa

During his reign, an Ottoman Admiral by the name of Mir Ali Beg was successful in establishing Ottoman supremacy in numerous cities in the Swahili coast between Mogadishu and Kilwa. Ottoman suzerainty was recognised in Mogadishu in 1585 and Ottoman supremacy was also established in other cities such as Barawa, Mombasa, Kilifi, Pate, Lamu, and Faza.

Financial affairs
Murad's reign was a time of financial stress for the Ottoman state. To keep up with changing military techniques, the Ottomans trained infantrymen in the use of firearms, paying them directly from the treasury. By 1580 an influx of silver from the New World had caused high inflation and social unrest, especially among Janissaries and government officials who were paid in debased currency. Deprivation from the resulting rebellions, coupled with the pressure of over-population, was especially felt in Anatolia. Competition for positions within the government grew fierce, leading to bribery and corruption. Ottoman and Habsburg sources accuse Murad himself of accepting enormous bribes, including 20,000 ducats from a statesman in exchange for the governorship of Tripoli and Tunisia, thus outbidding a rival who had tried bribing the Grand Vizier.

During his period, excessive inflation was experienced, the value of silver money was constantly played, food prices increased. 400 dirhams should be cut from 600 dirhams of silver, while 800 was cut, which meant 100 percent inflation.  For the same reason, the purchasing power of wage earners was halved, and the consequence was an uprising.

English pact
Numerous envoys and letters were exchanged between Elizabeth I and Sultan Murad III. In one correspondence, Murad entertained the notion that Islam and Protestantism had "much more in common than either did with Roman Catholicism, as both rejected the worship of idols", and argued for an alliance between England and the Ottoman Empire. To the dismay of Catholic Europe, England exported tin and lead (for cannon-casting) and ammunition to the Ottoman Empire, and Elizabeth seriously discussed joint military operations with Murad III during the outbreak of war with Spain in 1585, as Francis Walsingham was lobbying for a direct Ottoman military involvement against the common Spanish enemy.  This diplomacy would be continued under Murad's successor Mehmed III, by both the sultan and Safiye Sultan alike.

Personal life

Palace life
Following the example of his father Selim II, Murad was the second Ottoman sultan who never went on campaign during his reign, instead spending it entirely in Constantinople. During the final years of his reign, he did not even leave Topkapı Palace. For two consecutive years, he did not attend the Friday procession to the imperial mosque—an unprecedented breaking of custom. The Ottoman historian Mustafa Selaniki wrote that whenever Murad planned to go out to Friday prayer, he changed his mind after hearing of alleged plots by the Janissaries to dethrone him once he left the palace. Murad withdrew from his subjects and spent the majority of his reign keeping to the company of few people and abiding by a daily routine structured by the five daily Islamic prayers. Murad's personal physician Domenico Hierosolimitano described a typical day in the life of the sultan:

Murad's sedentary lifestyle and lack of participation in military campaigns earned him the disapproval of Mustafa Âlî and Mustafa Selaniki, the major Ottoman historians who lived during his reign. Their negative portrayals of Murad influenced later historians.  Both historians also accused Murad of sexual excess.

Children
Before becoming sultan, Murad had been loyal to Safiye Sultan, his Albanian concubine. His monogamy was disapproved of by his mother Nurbanu Sultan, who worried that Murad needed more sons to succeed him in case Mehmed died young. She also worried about Safiye's influence over her son and the Ottoman dynasty. Five or six years after his accession to the throne, Murad was given a pair of concubines by his sister Ismihan. Upon attempting sexual intercourse with them, he proved impotent. "The arrow [of Murad], [despite] keeping with his created nature, for many times [and] for many days has been unable to reach at the target of union and pleasure," wrote Mustafa Ali. Nurbanu accused Safiyye and her retainers of causing Murad's impotence with witchcraft. Several of Safiye's servants were tortured by eunuchs in order to discover a culprit. Court physicians, working under Nurbanu's orders, eventually prepared a successful cure, but a side effect was a drastic increase in sexual appetite—by the time Murad died, he was said to have fathered over a hundred children. Nineteen of these were executed by Mehmed III when he became sultan.

Women at court
Influential ladies of his court included his mother Nurbanu Sultan, his sister Ismihan Sultan, wife of grand vizier Sokollu Mehmed Pasha, and musahibes (favourites) mistress of the housekeeper Canfeda Hatun, mistress of financial affairs Raziye Hatun, and the poet Hubbi Hatun, Finally, after the death of his mother and older sister, his wife Safiye Sultan was the only influential woman in the court.

Eunuchs at court
Before Murad, the palace eunuchs had been mostly white. This began to change in 1582 when Murad gave an important position to a black eunuch. By 1592, the eunuchs' roles in the palace were racially determined: black eunuchs guarded the Sultan and the women, and white eunuchs guarded the male pages in another part of the palace. The chief black eunuch was known as the Kizlar Agha, and the chief white eunuch was known as the Kapi Agha.

Murad and the arts

Murad took great interest in the arts, particularly miniatures and books. He actively supported the court of Society of Miniaturists, commissioning several volumes including the Siyer-i Nebi, the most heavily illustrated biographical work on the life of the Islamic prophet Muhammad, the Book of Skills, the Book of Festivities and the Book of Victories. He had two large alabaster urns transported from Pergamon and placed on two sides of the nave in the Hagia Sophia in Constantinople and a large wax candle dressed in tin which was donated by him to the Rila monastery in Bulgaria is on display in the monastery museum.

Murad also furnished the content of Kitabü’l-Menamat (The Book of Dreams), addressed to Murad's spiritual advisor, Şüca Dede. A collection of first person accounts, it tells of Murad's spiritual experiences as a Sufi disciple. Compiled from thousands of letters Murad wrote describing his dream visions, it presents a hagiographic self-portrait. Murad dreams of various activities, including being stripped naked by his father and having to sit on his lap, single-handedly killing 12,000 infidels in battle, walking on water, ascending to heaven, and producing milk from his fingers.  He frequently encounters the Prophet Muhammed, and in one dream sits in the Prophet's lap and kisses his mouth.

In another letter addressed to Şüca Dede, Murad wrote "I wish that God, may He be glorified and exalted, had not created this poor servant as the descendant of the Ottomans so that I would not hear this and that, and would not worry. I wish I were of unknown pedigree. Then, I would have one single task, and could ignore the whole world."

The diplomatic edition of these dream letters have been recently published by Ozgen Felek in Turkish.

Death
Murad died from what is assumed to be natural causes in the Topkapı Palace and was buried in tomb next to the Hagia Sophia. In the mausoleum are 54 sarcophagus of the sultan, his wives and children that are also buried there. He is also responsible for changing the burial customs of the sultans' mothers. Murad had his mother Nurbanu buried next to her husband Selim II, making her the first consort to share a sultan's tomb.

Family

Consorts
Murad is believed to have had Safiye Sultan as his only concubine for twenty years (although the birth of Şehzade Selim and Mihrimah Sultan, born in this period but not universally attributed to Safiye seems to cast doubt on this assumption). However, Safiye was opposed by Murad's mother, Nurbanu Sultan, and by his sister, Ismihan Sultan, and between 1580 and 1582 she was exiled to the Old Palace on charges of having rendered the sultan impotent with a spell, after he had not succeeded or had not wanted to had sex with two concubines received by his sister. Furthermore, Nurbanu was concerned about the future of the dynasty, as she believed that Safiye's sons alone (two or three, one of whom died before 1580) were not enough to ensure the succession.. After Safiye's exile, revoked only after Nurbanu's death, Murad, to deny the rumor, took a huge number of concubines, of which only five are known to us, and he had more than fifty known children, although according to sources the total number could exceed hundred.

Murad's named consorts were:
 Safiye Sultan, an ethnic Albanian. Haseki Sultan of Murad and Valide sultan of Mehmed III;
 Şemsiruhsar Hatun, mother of Rukiye Sultan. She commissioned Koranic readings of prayers in the Prophet's mosque in Medina. She died before 1623.
 Mihriban Hatun;
 Şahıhuban Hatun;
 Nazperver Hatun;
Fakriye Hatun
Seven pregnant concubines in 1595, drowned by Mehmed III
Concubine seduced and made pregnant by Mehmed III when he was a prince. The act was a violation of the rules of the harem and the girl was drowned by Nurbanu Sultan to protect her grandson.

According to Üluçay, after the death of Murad III many of his concubines who became childless with Mehmed III's accession to the throne were remarried, along with those who had never given children to the sultan.

Sons
Murad III had at least 25 known sons.

On his death in 1595 Mehmed III, his eldest son and new sultan, executed the 19 half-brothers still alive and drowned seven pregnant concubines, fulfilling the Law of Fraticide.

Known sons of Murad III are:
 Sultan Mehmed III (26 May 1566, Manisa Palace, Manisa – 22 December 1603, Topkapı Palace, Constantinople, buried in Mehmed III Mausoleum, Hagia Sophia Mosque, Constantinople), son with Safiye, became the next sultan;
 Şehzade Selim (1567?, Manisa Palace, Manisa - murdered 28 January 1595, Topkapı Palace, Constantinople, buried in Murad III Mausoleum, Hagia Sophia Mosque). Possible son of Safiye if born before 1580, during Murad's years of monogamy.
 Şehzade Mahmud (1568, Manisa Palace, Manisa – 1580/1581, Topkapı Palace, Istanbul, buried in Selim II Mausoleum, Hagia Sophia Mosque); son with Safiye;
 Şehzade Fülan (June 1582, Topkapi Palace, Constantinople - June 1582, Topkapi Palace, Constantinople. buried in Murad III Mausoleum, Hagia Sophia Mosque). Stillbirth.
 Şehzade Cihangir (February 1585, Topkapi Palace, Constantinople - August 1585, Topkapı Palace, Constantinople, buried in Murad III Mausoleum, Hagia Sophia Mosque); twin of Şehzade Suleyman. 
 Şehzade Suleyman (February 1585, Topkapi Palace, Constantinople - 1585, Topkapi Palace, Constantinople, buried in Murad III Mausoleum, Hagia Sophia Mosque); twin of Şehzade Cihangir. 
 Şehzade Abdullah (1585, Topkapi Palace, Constantinople - murdered 28 January 1595, Topkapı Palace, Constantinople, buried in Murad III Mausoleum, Hagia Sophia Mosque);
 Şehzade Mustafa (1585, Topkapi Palace, Constantinople - murdered 28 January 1595, Topkapı Palace, Constantinople, buried in Murad III Mausoleum, Hagia Sophia Mosque);
 Şehzade Abdurrahman (1585, Topkapi Palace, Constantinople - murdered 28 January 1595, Topkapı Palace, Constantinople, buried in Murad III Mausoleum, Hagia Sophia Mosque);
 Şehzade Bayezid (1586, Topkapi Palace, Constantinople - murdered 28 January 1595, Topkapı Palace, Constantinople, buried in Murad III Mausoleum, Hagia Sophia Mosque);
 Şehzade Hasan (1586, Topkapi Palace, Consantinople - died 1591, Topkapı Palace, Constantinople, buried in Murad III Mausoleum, Hagia Sophia Mosque);
 Şehzade Cihangir (1587, Topkapi Palace, Constantinople - murdered 28 January 1595, Topkapı Palace, Constantinople, buried in Murad III Mausoleum, Hagia Sophia Mosque);
 Şehzade Yakub (1587, Topkapi Palace, Consantinople - murdered 28 January 1595, Topkapı Palace, Constantinople, buried in Murad III Mausoleum, Hagia Sophia Mosque);
 Şehzade Ahmed (?, Topkapi Palace, Consantinople - ?, Topkapı Palace, Constantinople, buried in Murad III Mausoleum, Hagia Sophia Mosque);
 Şehzade Alaeddin (?, Topkapi Palace, Constantinople - murdered 28 January 1595, Topkapı Palace, Constantinople, buried in Murad III Mausoleum, Hagia Sophia Mosque);
 Şehzade Davud (?, Topkapi Palace, Constantinople - murdered 28 January 1595, Topkapı Palace, Constantinople, buried in Murad III Mausoleum, Hagia Sophia Mosque);
 Şehzade Alemşah (?, Topkapi Palace, Constantinople - murdered 28 January 1595, Topkapı Palace, Constantinople, buried in Murad III Mausoleum, Hagia Sophia Mosque);
 Şehzade Ali (?, Topkapi Palace, Constantinople - murdered 28 January 1595, Topkapı Palace, Constantinople, buried in Murad III Mausoleum, Hagia Sophia Mosque);
 Şehzade Hüseyin (?, Topkapi Palace, Constantinople - murdered 28 January 1595, Topkapı Palace, Constantinople, buried in Murad III Mausoleum, Hagia Sophia Mosque);
 Şehzade Ishak (?, Topkapi Palace, Constantinople - murdered 28 January 1595, Topkapı Palace, Constantinople, buried in Murad III Mausoleum, Hagia Sophia Mosque);
 Şehzade Murad (?, Topkapi Palace, Constantinople - murdered 28 January 1595, Topkapı Palace, Constantinople, buried in Murad III Mausoleum, Hagia Sophia Mosque);
 Şehzade Osman (?, Topkapi Palace, Constantinople - died 1587, Topkapı Palace, Constantinople, buried in Murad III Mausoleum, Hagia Sophia Mosque);
 Şehzade Yusuf (?, Topkapi Palace, Constantinople - murdered 28 January 1595, Topkapı Palace, Constantinople, buried in Murad III Mausoleum, Hagia Sophia Mosque);
 Şehzade Korkut (?, Topkapi Palace,Constantinople - murdered 28 January 1595, Topkapı Palace, Constantinople, buried in Murad III Mausoleum, Hagia Sophia Mosque);
 Şehzade Ömer (?, Topkapi Palace, Constantinople - murdered 28 January 1595, Topkapı Palace, Constantinople, buried in Murad III Mausoleum, Hagia Sophia Mosque);
In addition to these, a European braggart, Alexander of Montenegro, claimed to be the lost son of Murad III and Safiye Sultan, presenting himself with the name of Şehzade Yahya and claiming the throne for it. His claims were never proven and appear dubious to say the least.

Daughters
Murad had at least thirty daughters known to be still alive at his death in 1595, of whom seventeen died of plague (or smallpox) in 1598. Many of the daughters' names are unknown. It is not known if and how many daughters may have died before him.

Known daughters of Murad III are:
 Hümaşah Sultan (Manisa,  1564 - Costantinople, after 1606; buried in Murad III Mausoleum, Hagia Sophia Mosque), daughter with Safiye Sultan. Also called Hüma Sultan. She married Nişar Mustafazade Mehmed Pasha (died 1586). She may have then married Serdar Ferhad Pasha (d.1595) in 1591.
 Ayşe Sultan (Manisa, c.1565 - Costantinople, 15 May 1605, buried in Murad III Mausoleum, Hagia Sophia Mosque), daughter with Safiye, married firstly on 20 May 1586, to Damat Ibrahim Pasha, married secondly on 5 April 1602, to Damad Yemişçi Hasan Pasha, married thirdly on 29 June 1604, to Damad Güzelce Mahmud Pasha.
 Fatma Sultan (Manisa,  1573 - Costantinople, 1620, buried in Murad III Mausoleum, Hagia Sophia Mosque), daughter with Safiye, married firstly on 6 December 1593, to Damad Halil Pasha, married secondly December 1604, to Damad Cafer Pasha; married thirtly 1610 Damat Hizir Pasha, married fourtly Damad Murad Pasha.
 Mihrimah Sultan (Costantinople,  1579 or  1592 - after 1625; buried in Murad III Mausoleum, Hagia Sophia Mosque), possibly daughter with Safiye, married in 1613 to Damad Mirahur Ahmed Pasha, married subsequently to Damad Çerkes Mehmed Pasha;
 Fahriye Sultan (died in 1656, buried in Murad III Mausoleum, Hagia Sophia Mosque), called also Fahri Sultan. Possibly daughter with Safiye, perhaps born after her return from exile in Old Palace. She married firstly to Cuhadar Ahmed Pasha, Governor of Mosul, married secondly to Damad Sofu Bayram Pasha, sometime Governor of Bosnia;
 Rukiye Sultan (buried in Murad III Mausoleum, Hagia Sophia Mosque), daughter with Şemsiruhsar Hatun, married in 1613 to Damad Nakkaş Hasan Pasha;
 Mihriban Sultan (buried in Murad III Mausoleum, Hagia Sophia Mosque) married in 1613 to Damad Kapıcıbaşı Topal Mehmed Agha;
 Hatice Sultan (1583, buried in Şehzade Mosque), was married in 1598 to Sokolluzade Lala Mehmed Pasha and had three children (a daughter and two sons) who died young. She participated in the reparation of the minarets of Bayezid Veli Mosque inside Kerch Fortress in 1599. After his death, she married Gürşci Mehmed Pasha of Kefe, governor of Bosnia.
Fethiye Sultan (buried in Murad III Mausoleum, Hagia Sophia Mosque). 
Seventeen daughters died of plague or smallpox in 1598. They are buried in Murad III Mausoleum, Hagia Sophia Mosque. At least two of them were married.
Four daughters who married before 1595.

In fiction
 Murad is portrayed by the Romanian actor Colea Rautu in the historic epic film Michael the Brave.

 Orhan Pamuk's historical novel Benim Adım Kırmızı (My Name is Red, 1998) takes place at the court of Murad III, during nine snowy winter days of 1591, which the writer uses in order to convey the tension between East and West. Murad is not specifically named in the book, and is referred to only as "Our Sultan".

 The Harem Midwife by Roberta Rich - a historical fiction set in Constantinople (1578) which follows Hannah, a midwife, who tends to many of the women in Sultan Murad III's harem.

 In the 2011 TV series Muhteşem Yüzyıl, Murad III is portrayed by Turkish actor Serhan Onat.

References

External links

 
 Ancestry of Sultana Nur-Banu (Cecilia Venier-Baffo)

[aged 48]

1546 births
1595 deaths
16th-century Ottoman sultans
Turks from the Ottoman Empire
Custodian of the Two Holy Mosques